Lemming Project is death metal group from Germany. Active from 1986 to 1993, they notably released two albums on Noise Records.

Discography
 Negative Hatecore (1990, demo)
 Extinction (1991, Noise)
 Hate and Despise (1992, Noise)

Two tracks from Extinction were also released as a Noise Records promo together with two tracks off Skyclad's The Wayward Sons of Mother Earth.

References

External links 
 

German death metal musical groups
Musical groups established in 1986
Musical groups disestablished in 1993
Noise Records artists